Burn Naze Halt railway station served Burn Naze in Thornton-Cleveleys, Lancashire, England, between 1909 and 1970. The platforms were heavily overgrown with vegetation until recently when the Poulton & Wyre Railway Society began restoration work.
 
The line used to be double track but has been reduced to single track since passenger services ceased in 1970.

Preservation 
In spring 2013, the Poulton & Wyre Railway Society were granted an extension to their licence from Network Rail to work on the trackbed; covering the whole branch from Poulton. They then began work on clearing the platforms at Burn Naze Station, as of February 2014 the station has been cleared extensively and the society are continuing their clearance work ready for the line to reopen.

See also
The Burn Naze, a nearby public house

References

External links

 Poulton and Wyre Railway Society, working towards restoring passenger services to Fleetwood.
 Google Street View of Burn Naze Station

Disused railway stations in the Borough of Wyre
The Fylde
Former Preston and Wyre Joint Railway stations
Railway stations in Great Britain opened in 1909
Railway stations in Great Britain closed in 1970
1908 establishments in England